The 2021–22 Northern Michigan Wildcats men's ice hockey season was the 46th season of play for the program and the 24th season in the CCHA conference. The Wildcats represented Northern Michigan University and were coached by Grant Potulny, in his 5th season.

Season
Northern Michigan joined with six other members of the WCHA to restart the CCHA for the 2021–22 season. They opened their season with a weekend sweep but then ran into trouble with a 5-game losing skid. While the offense was able to produce, the Wildcats did not receive adequate goaltending from Rico DiMatteo. Come November, however, the results began to improve and Northern Michigan rose a high-octane offense to a winning record. The team's attack was led by Hank Crone and A. J. Vanderbeck, both of whom would finish among the national scoring leaders. The best performance on the season came in early December when NMU took on then-#1 Minnesota Duluth and swept both games. While the Bulldogs were forced to use their third string goalie due to illness and injury, putting up 5 goals in both games against one of the nation's top defenses was still impressive. The victories also garnered Northern Michigan with their first ranking of the season and set the team up as a possible surprise for the NCAA Tournament. Unfortunately, the Wildcats ended the first half of their year getting swept by Lake Superior State and immediately dropping out of the polls.

The second half of the season began well for the Wildcats and when the team split a weekend with Minnesota State they reentered the top-20. After a week off, the team was again stymied by the Lakers and kicked out of the rankings. More importantly, however, was that DiMatteo's play in net had become so inconsistent that the team turned to freshman Charlie Glockner. The new starter immediately provided a boost in goal and the team tried to make a bid for a home site in the postseason, but their 1–3 record versus Lake Superior ultimately left them in the 5th position.

The Wildcats had to travel to Sault Ste. Marie to take on their long-time rival but their powerful offense, which had carried them to victory so often during the season, gave Northern Michigan the edge. After splitting the first two games, NMU found itself down 1–3 mid-way through the deciding game but then went on a rampage in the Lakers' zone. In exactly 8 minutes of game time, Northern Michigan scored four goals and took a commanding 5–3 lead. Glockner was able to hold off Lake Superior for most of the third and give the Wildcats a date in the conference semifinal. There they found Minnesota State waiting for them but the Mavericks were looking for revenge. NMU had downed Minnesota State in the semis the year before and MSU was going to make sure there was no repeat. Northern Michigan was completely swamped, getting outshot 21–34 and outscored 1–8. While the end of their season wasn't pretty, the team had been able to provide some stunning highlights during the year.

Departures

Recruiting

Roster
As of September 6, 2021.

Standings

Schedule and results

|-
!colspan=12 style=";" | Exhibition

|-
!colspan=12 style=";" | Regular Season

|-
!colspan=12 style=";" | 

|- align="center" bgcolor="#e0e0e0"
|colspan=12|Northern Michigan Won Series 2–1

Scoring statistics

Goaltending statistics

Rankings

Note: USCHO did not release a poll in week 24.

Awards and honors

References

2021–22
Northern Michigan Wildcats
Northern Michigan Wildcats
Northern Michigan Wildcats
Northern Michigan Wildcats